Syzygium bourdillonii is a species of plant in the family Myrtaceae. It is endemic to Kerala in India. It is threatened by habitat loss.

References

bourdillonii
Flora of Kerala
Endangered plants
Taxonomy articles created by Polbot